Paul Timothy Hogan (September 5, 1898 – August 13, 1976) was a professional football player for the Akron Pros, Canton Bulldogs, New York Giants, Frankford Yellow Jackets and the Chicago Cardinals. He played football at Washington & Jefferson College, Notre Dame, University of Detroit Mercy, and Niagara University.  He played in the National Football League from 1924 through the 1927 season. Hogan won the 1926 NFL championship with the Yellow Jackets. After playing in the NFL, Paul joined the independent Ironton Tanks in 1927. In an 18-0 victory over Jim Thorpe and the Portsmouth Shoe-Steels, Hogan ran a punt back for a touchdown in the second quarter.

Notes

External links
 
 

1898 births
1976 deaths
Players of American football from Ohio
Akron Pros players
Canton Bulldogs players
Chicago Cardinals players
Frankford Yellow Jackets players
New York Giants players
Niagara Purple Eagles football players
Notre Dame Fighting Irish football players
Detroit Titans football players
Washington & Jefferson Presidents football players
People from Ashtabula, Ohio
Burials in Nevada